The Hans Freudenberg Kolleg (HFK) is an independent dormitory in Karlsruhe, Germany, owned by the Studentenwohnheim e.V.. Founded in 1965, it is named after Hans Freudenberg, a German engineer.

The HFK provides 100 rooms on 7 floors. Most students are from the University of Karlsruhe, while others are from HS Karlsruhe, PH Karlsruhe, or Hochschule für Musik Karlsruhe.

References 
Hans Freudenberg (in German)

External links 
 http://www.studentenwohnheim-ev.de/ 
 http://www.hfk-online.de/ 

Buildings and structures in Karlsruhe
Educational institutions established in 1965
1965 establishments in West Germany